Cam Lộ is a township and capital of Cam Lộ District, Quảng Trị Province, Vietnam.

References

Populated places in Quảng Trị province
District capitals in Vietnam
Townships in Vietnam